The Huard River is a tributary of the Ha! Ha! River, Flowing in the municipality of Ferland-et-Boilleau, in the Le Fjord-du-Saguenay Regional County Municipality, in the administrative region of Saguenay-Lac-Saint-Jean, in the province of Quebec, in Canada.

The Huard River valley is served mainly by the route 381 which runs along the course of the Ha! Ha! River and Lake Ha! Ha! for the needs of forestry, agriculture and recreational tourism activities.

Forestry is the main economic activity in the sector; recreational tourism, second.

The surface of the Huard River is usually frozen from the beginning of December to the end of March, however safe circulation on the ice is generally done from mid-December to mid-March.

Geography 
The main watersheds adjacent to the Huard River are:
 north side: Ha! Ha! River, Lac du Berger, Bras de Ross, Rivière des Cèdres, Pierre River;
 East side: Lac Charny, "Lac de la Grosse Cabane", ruisseau à John, Cami River, Malbaie River;
 south side: Ha! Ha! River, Lake Ha! Ha!, Petit lac Ha! Ha!, Pierre River, Malbaie River, Cruche River, Porc-Épic River;
 west side: rivière à Pierre, Ha! Ha! River, lake Ha! Ha!, rivière à Mars, Bras d'Hamel.

The Huard River originates from a mountain stream (altitude: in a deep valley. This source is located at:
  south-east of Huard Lake;
  north of Petit lac Ha! Ha!;
  south-east of the dam at the mouth of Lake Ha! Ha! which is crossed by the Ha! Ha! River;
  north-west of a mountain peak which reaches ;
  south-east of the confluence of the Huard River and Ha! Ha! River.

From its source, the course of the Huard River flows over  according to the following segments:
  north-east across Lake Huard, to its mouth. Note: Lac Huard receives the discharge on the east side of Lacs Charny and de la Grosse Cabane;
  north-west, to its mouth.

The Huard River flows into a small bay on the west shore of Lake Ha! Ha!. This mouth is located at:

  south-east of the center of the village of Ferland;
  north-west of Huard Lake;
  north-east of the dam on the Ha! Ha! River located at the mouth of Lake Ha! Ha!;
  south-east of the confluence of the Ha! Ha! and Baie des Ha! Ha!;
  south-east of downtown Saguenay (city).

From the confluence of the Huard River, the current follows the course of the Ha! Ha! River on  generally towards the northeast, crosses the Baie des Ha!

Toponymy 
The toponym "Huard River" was formalized on September 26, 1997, by the Commission de toponymie du Québec.

See also 

 List of rivers of Quebec

References 

Rivers of Saguenay–Lac-Saint-Jean
Le Fjord-du-Saguenay Regional County Municipality